Walter Thomas West (born May 14, 1943) was a Major General in the U.S. Air Force.  His last post was to serve as the Commander of the 19th Air Force, Air Education and Training Command at Randolph Air Force Base in Texas.

Prior to that position he served Deputy Director for operations for the U.S. Pacific Command, and as Commander of the 57th Fighter Weapons Wing at Nellis Air Force Base in Nevada.

Education
 Bachelor's degree in Business Administration from Florida State University in 1965.
 Master's degree in Psychology from Troy State University in 1976.

References

External links

Florida State University alumni
United States Air Force generals
Living people
1943 births
People from Henry County, Alabama
Recipients of the Legion of Merit
Recipients of the Defense Superior Service Medal